The Euphrates Viaduct is a motorway bridge across the Euphrates between Belkıs, Nizip, Gaziantep Province and Birecik, Şanlıurfa Province in Turkey. Built up to 2007, it is the longest river bridge in Turkey. Buses and other cars going from the three big cities (Istanbul, Ankara and Izmir) to Diyarbakır, play an important role on this viaduct. Cars going to Diyarbakır can also use the Kömürhan Bridge which carries  state roadway between Malatya and Elazığ.

Project 
The viaduct is a part of the  Adana-Gaziantep-Urfa Motorway, which will be extended up to Habur border gate in the Iraqi border/frontier. The viaduct carries 6 lanes of motorway. 14,000 cubic-metre (m3) tonnes of iron and 94,583 cubic metres of concrete were used during the construction. It is frequently used by cars/trucks/buses in Gaziantep (from Urfa) and/or Urfa (from Gaziantep) direction. The viaduct cost 70 million new Turkish liras (2007).

References

Bridges in Turkey
Crossings of the Euphrates
Road bridges in Turkey
Bridges completed in 2007
2007 establishments in Turkey
Bridges over the Euphrates River